Manuel Montesinos (born 27 August 1957) is a Spanish modern pentathlete. He competed at the 1980 Summer Olympics.

References

1957 births
Living people
Spanish male modern pentathletes
Olympic modern pentathletes of Spain
Modern pentathletes at the 1980 Summer Olympics